Early Scots was the emerging literary language of the Northern Middle English speaking parts of Scotland in the period before 1450. The northern forms of Middle English descended from Northumbrian Old English. During this period, speakers referred to the language as "English" (Inglis, Ynglis, and variants).

Early examples such as Barbour’s The Brus and Wyntoun’s Chronicle  are better explained as part of Northern Middle English than as isolated forerunners of later Scots, a name first used to describe the language later in the Middle Scots period.

History 

Northumbrian Old English had been established in south-eastern Scotland as far as the River Forth in the 7th century and largely remained there until the 13th century, which is why in the late 12th century Adam of Dryburgh described his locality as "in the land of the English in the Kingdom of the Scots" and why the early 13th century author of de Situ Albanie wrote that the Firth of Forth "divides the kingdoms of the Scots and of the English".

Political developments in the 12th century facilitated the spread of the English language. Institutions such as the burghs first established by David I, mostly in the south and east of Scotland, brought new communities into the areas in which they were established. Incoming burghers were mainly English (notably from regions like Yorkshire and Huntingdonshire), Dutch and French. Although the population of the largest burghs would have been counted in hundreds rather than thousands, a radical social shift occurred whereby many Gaelic speakers became assimilated into the new social system and its language.

The increasing economic influence of the burghs attracted further English, Fleming and Scandinavian immigration. As the economic power of the burghs grew, Gaelic-speakers from the hinterland found it advantageous to acquire a working knowledge of English. The institutional language of the burghs consisted of vocabulary that was Germanic in origin, such English terms as toft (homestead and land), croft (smallholding), ruid (land let by a burgh), guild (a trade association), bow (an arched gateway), wynd (lane) and raw (row of houses).

The end of the House of Dunkeld led to the throne being passed to three families of Anglo-French origin, the Balliols, Bruces and Stewarts. After the death of King Robert I, the kings of Scotland (with the exception of King Robert II) increasingly identified themselves with the English-speaking part of the kingdom. As a result, by the reign of King James I of Scotland, the political heartland of the Scottish king moved from the area around Scone and Perth to the traditionally English area around Edinburgh south of the Forth.

By the 14th and 15th centuries, the variety of English that resulted from the above influences had replaced Gaelic in much of the lowlands and Norman French had ceased to be used as the language of the elite. By this time differentiation into Southern, Central and Northern dialects had perhaps occurred. Scots was also beginning to replace Latin as a language for records and literature. In Caithness, it came into contact with both Norn and Gaelic.

Vocabulary 

The core vocabulary is of Anglo-Saxon origin although many of the differences in the phonology, morphology and lexicon in the northern and southern dialects of Middle English  have been traced to the linguistic influence in the North of the eighth- and ninth-century Viking invaders who first plundered, then conquered and settled in, large territories in Northumbria, Lincolnshire and East Anglia. Scots also retained many words which became obsolete farther south. The pattern of foreign borrowings, such as Romance via ecclesiastical and legal Latin and French, was much the same as that of contemporary English but was often different in detail because of the continuing influence of the Auld Alliance and the imaginative use of Latinisms in literature.

The vocabulary of Scots was augmented by the speech of Scandinavians, Flemings, Dutch and Middle Low German speakers through trade with, and immigration from, the low countries.

From Scandinavian (often via Scandinavian influenced Middle English) came  at (that/who), byg (build), bak (bat), bla (blae), bra (brae), ferlie (marvel), flyt (remove), fra (from), gar (compel), gowk (cuckoo), harnis (brains), ithand (industrious),  low (flame), lug (an appendage, ear), man (must),  neve (fist), sark (shirt), spe (prophesy), þa (those), til (to), tinsell (loss),  (valiant), and wyll (lost, confused).

A number of Gaelic words such as breive (judge), cane (a tribute), couthal (court of justice), davach (a measure of land), duniwassal (nobleman), kenkynolle (head of the kindred), mare (tax collector), and toschachdor (leader, cf. Irish , Welsh ) occurred in early legal documents but most became obsolete early in the period. Gaelic words for topographical features have endured, such as bogg (bog), carn (pile of stones), corrie (hollow in a hill), crag (rock), inch (small island), knok (hill), loch (lake or fjord), and strath (river valley).

Orthography 

The language first appeared in written form in the mid-14th century, when its written form differed little from that of northern English dialects, and so Scots shared many Northumbrian borrowings from Old Norse and Anglo-Norman French. The reduced set of verb agreement endings in particular give the language an uncannily modern appearance when compared to the writing of English contemporaries such as Geoffrey Chaucer.
Some orthographic features distinguishing Northern Middle English and Early Scots from other regional variants of written Middle English are:

The notable use of the Northern subject rule, which according to one hypothesis, is thought to have arisen through contact with the Celtic languages of Britain during the early medieval period. Another  hypothesis proposes a possible path of developments from the reduction of verbal affixes followed by originally enclitic postverbal pronouns.

The forms of the third person plural pronoun  they/their/them (derived from Old Norse) which later moved southwards to replace the older Southern he/here/hem forms (derived from Old English).

The reduced set of verb agreement endings originating in the 9th or 10th centuries. In Northern Middle English, in the present tense, in all persons and numbers but the first singular, which had –e, the ending was –(e)s; and in Scotland even the first person singular was occasionally –s. Whereas the Old English and Southern and Midlands Middle English pattern had –e, -(e)s(t), -(e)th in the three persons of the singular and –(a)th (-(e)n in the Midlands) in all persons of the plural.

Loss of the Old English prefix ge-, often y- or i- further south.

The single syllable northern infinitive (sing rather than the Old English singan), whereas the past participle -en inflection was used in the South. The final e was silent in the North but still pronounced further south.

The northern present participle –and, whereas –, – was used in the South, and the northern past participle of strong verbs, in for example,  and southern .

 The Scottish -yt/-it for the past tense, the northern form was usually -yd/-id where further south -ed was used.

In the North and in the Northeast Midlands evidence from poetry indicates a pattern unlike that of Old English reflecting contact with a Scandinavian-influenced one. Whereas in the West Midlands and Southern dialects of early Middle English the verb-second (V2) pattern of Old English is largely maintained.

The retention of Old English long a in where, further south, this long a had "rounded" to an open o: (hayly  holy, ane one, wald would awne own, hald hold). The practice of indicating a long vowel by means of a following –y or –i: (boite boot,  doyne done, soyne soon, boythe both).

By the end of the period when Middle Scots began to emerge, orthography and phonology had diverged significantly from that of Northern Middle English.

Phonology 

The Early Scots vowel system (c 1375)

The Scandinavian-influenced  in words such as birk (birch), brekis (breeches), brig (bridge), kirk (church), kist (chest), mekil (much) and rig (ridge), and the retention of Germanic  in words such as lowp (leap), cowp (cf. cheap, to trade) and nowt (cattle).

Literature

Sample text 
Renunciation by Alexander Lindsay, knight, Lord of Glenesk, of certain lands, in favour of Margaret Countess of Marr and her sister Elizabeth. 12 March 1379.

Notes

See also 
 History of the Scots language
 Phonological history of the Scots language
 Dictionary of the Scots Language

References 

 A History of Scots to 1700 in A Dictionary of Older Scots Vol. 12. Oxford University Press 2002.
 Aitken, A.J. (1977) How to Pronounce Older Scots in Bards and Makars. Glasgow, Glasgow University Press.
 Aitken, A.J. (2002) Macafee C. (Ed) The Older Scots Vowels: A History of the Stressed Vowels of Older Scots From the Beginnings to the Eighteenth century. Edinburgh, The Scottish Text Society. 
 Jones, Charles (1997) The Edinburgh History of the Scots Language. Edinburgh, University of Edinburgh Press. 
 Slater, J. (1952) 'An edition of Early Scots texts from the beginnings to 1410', Dissertation, 2 Vols, University of Edinburgh.

External links 
 Dictionary of the Scots Language
 Scottish Language Dictionaries Ltd
 Reading Older Scots
 Teaching Package
 The Scottish Text Society

Scots language
Scots, Early
Scotland in the High Middle Ages
Scotland in the Late Middle Ages